Dilli may refer to:

 Dilli (film), a 2011 short documentary film
 Dillī or Delhi, the National Capital Territory of India
 Naī Dillī or New Delhi, a municipality within the National Capital Territory
 Dilli, Kemaliye
 Dilli Village, Fraser Island, Queensland

See also
 Dili, the capital and largest city of East Timor
 Delhi (disambiguation)